was a Japanese academic, historian of Chinese legal history and Professor Emeritus of Oriental Laws at the University of Tokyo (Todai).

Biography
In 1925, Niida began his studies at the University of Tokyo, where he would eventually be awarded his doctorate.  Niida was a professor and legal history scholar at the University of Tokyo.  Among the students he influenced was Denis Twitchett, who studied with him in Tokyo in 1953-54.  He is known for having written  which has been the subject of a multi-year process of translation into English.

Selected works
In a statistical overview derived from writings by and about Naboru Niida, OCLC/WorldCat encompasses roughly 100+ works in 200+ publications in 5 languages and 900+ library holdings.

 唐令拾遺 (1933)
 中國の社會とギルド (1951)
 中國の農村家族 (1952)
 中國農村慣行調 (1952)
  中國法制史 (1952)
 中国の法と社會と歷史: 遺稿集 (1966)
 中国の伝統と革命: 仁井田陞集 (1974)

Honors
 Imperial Academy, Imperial Prize, 1934 for A Reconstruction of the Administrative and Civil Code of the Tang Dynasty

Notes

References
 Boyd, Kelly. (1999). Encyclopedia of Historians and Historical Writing. London: Fitzroy Dearborn. ;  OCLC 468449026 
 Fukushima, Masao.  "Profile of an Asian-minded man: Noburo Niida," in The Developing Economies, No 5-1, 1967. p. 173-190. 
 Wright, Arthur F. and John Whitney Hall.  "Supplement: Chinese and Japanese Historiography: Some Trends, 1961-1966," Annals of the American Academy of Political and Social Science, Vol. 371, (May, 1967), pp. 178–193.

Academic staff of the University of Tokyo
University of Tokyo alumni
20th-century Japanese historians
1904 births
1966 deaths
Laureates of the Imperial Prize